Antonine University (UA) is a Lebanese Catholic university committed to offer quality education, to promote inter-disciplinary and contextualized research, and to enhance the sustainable wellbeing of its local and global communities. Its graduates are proactive citizens prepared to embrace an ever-growing knowledge, improve it collaboratively, and apply it responsibly.

Campuses 

Antonine University (UA) has three campuses all over Lebanon. All the campuses share the same objectives to offer quality education, to promote inter-disciplinary and contextualized research, and to enhance the sustainable wellbeing of its local and global communities.

Hadat–Baabda Main Campus

Nabi Ayla–Zahle Campus

Mejdalya–Zgharta Campus

Services and Facilities

To facilitate their insertion on campus, UA provides all its students with quality services and facilities:

- Office of Orientation and Admissions

- Office of Students Affairs

- Financial Aid and Scholarships

- Office of Social Affairs

- Student Academic Success Service

- Center for Career Development

- Center for Continuing Education

- Language Center

- Office of Alumni

- Library

- Academic and Teaching Laboratories

- Cafeteria

- Clubs and Societies

- Counseling Service

- Student Dormitories

- Parking

- Courts

- Gymnasium

- Pools and more

Majors and Programs

 Faculty of Business Administration
Bachelor of Business Administration – Accounting, Control, and Auditing    

Bachelor of Business Administration – Marketing and Management    

Bachelor of Business Administration – Banking and Finance    

Bachelor of Business Administration – Human Resource Management    

Master of Business Administration – Accounting and Auditing    

Master of Business Administration – Marketing and International Management    

Master of Business Administration – Banking and Finance   

Master of Business Administration – Human Resource Management   

Master of Business Administration – Operations and Logistics Management    

Master of Business Administration – Digital Marketing    

Master of Business Administration - General Management (MBA)

 Faculty of Engineering
 Department of Computer and Communications Engineering
Bachelor of Engineering in Computer and Communications Engineering – Telecommunications and Networks  

Bachelor of Engineering in Computer and Communications Engineering – Multimedia and Networks  

Bachelor of Engineering in Computer and Communications Engineering – Systems and Networks  

Bachelor of Engineering in Computer and Communications Engineering – Software Engineering and Network

 Department of Computer Science

Bachelor of Technology in Computer Science
 Faculty of Information and Communication
Bachelor of Arts in Advertising    

Bachelor of Arts in Advertising – Audiovisual  

Bachelor of Arts in Advertising – Graphic Design  

Bachelor of Arts in Advertising – Journalism and Radio/TV 

Master of Arts in Information and Communication  

Master in Information and Communication – Audiovisual  

Master of Arts in Information and Communication for Arab World – Journalism and Radio/TV  

Master in Information and Communication for Arab World – Journalism and Radio/TV

 Faculty of Music and Musicology
Bachelor of Arts in Music and Musicology – Music Education Sciences  

Bachelor of Arts in Music and Musicology – Music Therapy  

Bachelor of Arts in Music and Musicology – Music, Technology, and Media  

Bachelor of Arts in Music and Musicology – General Musicology of Traditions  

Bachelor of Arts in Music and Musicology – Arabic Art Music  

Bachelor of Arts in Music and Musicology – European Art Music   

Teaching Diploma in Music and Musicology  

Master 1 in Music and Musicology – Music Education Sciences    

Master 1 in Music and Musicology – Music Therapy  

Master 1 in Music and Musicology – Music, Technology, and Media  

Master 1 in Music and Musicology – General Musicology of Traditions  

Master 1 in Music and Musicology – Arabic Art Music  

Master 1 in Music and Musicology – European Art Music  

Master 2 in Music and Musicology

 Faculty of Public Health
 Department of Dental Laboratory Technology
Bachelor of Science in Dental Laboratory Technology  

Advanced Diploma in Dental Laboratory Technology

 Department of Nursing Sciences  
Bachelor of Science in Nursing Sciences  

Master of Science in Nursing Sciences
 Department of Physical Therapy  
Bachelor of Science in Physical Therapy
 Faculty of Sport Sciences
Bachelor of Arts in Physical Education and Sport – Motricity Education and Adapted Physical Activities  

Bachelor of Arts in Physical Education and Sport – Sports Training  

Bachelor of Arts in Physical Education and Sport – Sports Management  

Teaching Diploma in Physical Education and Sport    

European University Diploma for Physical Preparation (Claude Bernard University Lyon 1)   

Master of Arts in Sport Sciences – Motricity Education and Adapted Physical Activities  

Master of Arts in Sport Sciences – Sports Training  

Master of Arts in Sport Sciences – Sports Management

MBA in Sports Management (ESG)
 Faculty of Theological Sciences and Pastoral Studies
Bachelor of Arts in Theological Sciences and Pastoral Studies  

Master of Arts in Theological Sciences and Pastoral Studies  

Master of Arts in Theological Sciences and Pastoral Studies – Theology of the Consecrated Life 

Certificate in Training of Trainers for the Consecrated Life

External links
 Antonine University (UA)

Universities in Lebanon
Baabda District